Scientific terminology